Catherine Meyburgh is a South African film editor, filmmaker, artist and project designer.

Career 
She started her career as a film editor in 1983 mainly focusing documentaries. She has served as an editor in over 30 documentaries which have been telecast on Arte, Channel 4, BBC and NBC. She worked as a film editor in animated films of prominent contemporary artist William Kentridge in 1990's. As a project designer in theatre and opera, she has worked with fellow prominent artists including Leora Farber, Georgia Papageorge and Willem Boshoff. Her project design have been displayed in various international exhibitions held in New York, Paris. She also initiated a project titled The Head & the Load collaborating with fellow artists William Kentridge, Philip Miller and Thuthuka Sibisi.

Films

Kentridge & Dumas in Conversation 
Her directorial Kentridge & Dumas in Conversation is based on the real stories of contemporary artists William Kentridge and Marlene Dumas. The film reveals two of them involve in discussion regarding drawing, painting and filmmaking.

Dying for Gold 
She co-directed the film Dying for Gold with Namibian filmmaker Richard Pakleppa which depicts the untold real story about the mining in South Africa. The film describes the difficulties faced by miners when they involve in search for gold.

Filmography 
As Projection designer

 1996 - UBU 
 2005 - The Magic Flute/Die Zauberflöte by Mozart
 2005 - Black Box/Chamber Noire
 2012 - The Refusal of Time and Refuse the Hour 
 2010 - The Nose by Shostakovitch
 2015 - Lulu by Alban Berg
 2016 - Bikohausen
 2017 - Wozzeck by Alban Berg
 2018 - The Head & the Load 
2019 - Mining Bodies 
2021 - Something this way comes

As editor 

 1988 - Space Mutiny
1988 - Tyger, Tyger burning bright
1988 - Namibia, no easy road to Freedom
1990 - Nowhere to Play
1992 - The Clay Ox
1994 - Soweto, a history
1997 - SABC 20 years, the untold story
1998 - Robert Sobukwe
1998 - Yizo Yizo 1
1998 - Weighing... and Wanting
1998 - Alan Paton's Beloved Country
1999 - Stereoscope
1999 - Portrait of a Young Man Drowning
 2000 - The Guguletu Seven 2000 - Soul City
2000 - Sol Plaatje, A Man for Our Time
2001 - Yizo Yizo 22003 - 7 Fragments for Georges Méliès and Journey to the Moon
2003 - Sophiatown2003 - Tide Table
2003 - Day for Night
2003 - Africa Rifting, lines of fire
2004 - Zero Tolerance2005 - Crossing the Line 2006 - Heartlines 2006 - Angola: Saudades from the One who Loves You2006 - The Bushman's Secrets2006 - I am not me, the horse is not mine  
2007 - The Glow of White Women2007 - REwind: A Cantata for Voice,Tape & Testimony
2007 - What will come (has already come)
 2008 - Gugu and Andile2008 - Bloodlines
2009 - For which I am Prepared to Die
2009 - Kentridge and Dumas in Conversation2009 - Breathe, Dissolve & Return
2011 - Other Faces
2011 - Bettie 2012 - Taste of Rain2013 - Nelson Mandela: The Myth and Me2014 - Body Games/Jogo de Corpo2014 - When we were Black 2 2018 - Dying for Gold2020 - Deliver Me
2021 - Ghosted Matter

 As director 

 1992 - The Clay Ox
1998 - Alan Paton's Beloved Country
2008 - Viva Madiba, a hero for all seasons
2009 - Kentridge and Dumas in Conversation2011 - Bettie 2018 - Dying for GoldAs Producer/co-producer

 1992 - The Clay Ox
 1998 - Alan Paton's Beloved Country
 2007 - The Glow of White Women 2012 - Taste of Rain 2018 - Dying for Gold]''

Animation

 2016 - The Takeover - David Koloane
 2019 - Something out of nothing - David Koloane
 2021 - Phantom Hurt

References

External links 

 

Living people
South African film directors
South African women film directors
South African documentary film directors
South African film editors
Year of birth missing (living people)